Spelunker is a 1983 platform video game developed by Timothy G. Martin of MicroGraphic Image. It is set in a colossal cave, with the player starting at the cave's entrance at the top, and the objective is to get to the treasure at the bottom.

Originally released by MicroGraphic Image for the Atari 8-bit family in 1983, the game was later ported to the Commodore 64 and re-released by Broderbund in 1984, with European publishing rights licensed to Ariolasoft. It was released on arcade in 1985, on the Nintendo Entertainment System on December 6, 1985 in Japan and September 1987 in North America, and on the MSX in 1986. A sequel was released in arcades in 1986 called Spelunker II: 23 no Kagi, and a different sequel for the NES on September 18, 1987 called Spelunker II: Yūsha e no Chōsen, both by Irem and in Japan only.

Gameplay

The player must walk and jump through increasingly challenging parts of the cave, all while working with a finite supply of fresh air, which can be replenished at various points.

The cave's hazards include bats, which drop deadly guano on the player; and a ghost haunting the cave, randomly appearing to take the player to the shadow world. The player character can send a blast of air to push the ghost away. However, this renders the player's character immobile for a few seconds, thus vulnerable to other dangers and further depleting their air supply. Objects to collect include sticks of dynamite, flares, and keys. Precise positioning and jumping are key factors in successfully completing the game.

The cave is divided into six levels. Although the levels connect seamlessly to each other, forming one large map, the game clearly signals a level change at certain points by showing the name of the next level and giving the player a bonus, consisting of an extra life and a varying number of points. Once a player completed all six levels, a new cave will be started with the same layout but with increasing difficulty. There are six caves total. While using the same game and scenery elements, the NES and MSX levels (which are shared with the Wii and 3DS versions) are far smaller than the Atari/C64 levels. The Arcade version uses additional game elements (such as shooting and scuba diving) and has an original level design. The same is true for Spelunker HD.

The splash screen of the original Atari version features an excerpt of Modest Mussorgsky's Pictures at an Exhibition as title music. All other versions of the game, including the Atari re-release feature a different title theme. The NES and MSX versions have additional music during gameplay.

Development
MicroGraphicImage was founded by former employees of Games by Apollo, one of the companies that had overproduced games for the Atari 2600, creating a glut of cheap games. In the pre-Christmas market of 1983, Games by Apollo became insolvent, with several games still in development for a number of platforms, including the Atari 400/800. Three former programmers from this company; Tim Martin, Robert Barber, and Cash Foley, subsequently formed MicroGraphicImage. Martin had been previously worked on games for the Atari 2600 and Foley developed for the Atari 8-bit family. When Games by Apollo went into insolvency, Martin and Barber developed a game entitled Halloween, based on the movie. The contract funded the founding of MicroGraphicImage. The game was released by Wizard Video Games during the video game crash of 1983 and sold poorly.

Martin and Barber's expertise was with the Atari 2600, and they were dissatisfied with the money being made through contract game development. Their strategy was to utilize the contract programming to leverage the funding of a software publishing company. Cash Foley joined as a technical specialist with Atari and Apple computer programming. At the January 1983 Consumer Electronics Show in Las Vegas, they developed a relationship with Gary Carlson, one of the founders of Broderbund. In early 1983, MicroGraphicImage developed games under contract for Broderbund, Parker Brothers, and CBS Electronics, while developing Spelunker for themselves.

Martin and Barber had been developing the Spelunker game design for some time, but it went beyond the specifications for the Atari 2600. Martin was responsible for game logic, Foley developed the graphic engine and game level editor, and Barber was the graphic designer and level editor. As Spelunker was Martin's original idea and he programmed the game logic, the game was issued with his name as the lead game developer, with the intention to alternate this role for subsequent games. However, the short lifespan of the company meant that this did not happen. In 1984, they turned publication over to Broderbund and made a version of the game for Commodore 64, very similar to the original.

Although MicroGraphicImage was able to maintain a steady stream of contract work, the company was not profitable due to the overheads of financial business focus going into publishing. The game recession that started in the winter of 1982 deteriorated, and it was very difficult to find distributors to take games, especially from small publishers. Eventually, MicroGraphicImage ran out of money and ceased operations. Martin continued working with Broderbund on a business level and was able recover all debt through NES and coin-op versions of Spelunker.

Martin and Foley continued to work together, including at an Amiga publishing company called Inovatronics. Eventually, Martin was a co-founder of the Internet provider, Internet America. As of 2007, Foley was working at Perot Systems.

Reception

The game was met with positive reviews. Bryan Welch reviewed the original Atari-8 bit version of Spelunker for 1984 Antic Magazine Buyers Guide and concluded: "I wholeheartedly recommend Spelunker to anyone who likes arcade-type games and is looking for a challenge. It's one game you'll always come back to."
Computer Gaming World of 1985 called Spelunker "a thoroughly enjoyable game ... a class act". In Japan, Game Machine listed the arcade version of Spelunker on their February 15, 1986 issue as being the fourth most-successful table arcade unit of the month.

Legacy
The game was re-released for Virtual Console in North America on March 17, 2008, and in Europe on September 5, 2008, for the Wii, in both regions on June 6, 2013, for the Wii U and in North America on June 27, 2013, for the Nintendo 3DS.

Sony Computer Entertainment of Japan released Spelunker HD for the PlayStation 3 on the PlayStation Network Store. It received the PlayStation Store best sales award in 2009 from Sony Computer Entertainment of Japan. The game is a remake of the NES port, with high definition graphics and 10 large caves with 10 levels in each.

In 2015, Square Enix released the free-to-play sequel Spelunker World for PlayStation 4 and PlayStation Vita. On April 20, 2017, a new game based on Spelunker World was released in Japan for the Nintendo Switch. It was later released as a download worldwide and physically only in Japan, as Spelunker Party! on October 19, 2017.

In 2016, a collaboration between Spelunker and the Neptunia series resulted to an unlockable minigame mode called "Neplunker" for Megadimension Neptunia VII.

An updated version of the game was announced in 2018 for the Intellivision Amico.

See also 
 Spelunky
 SteamWorld Dig

References

External links 
 Spelunker at Atari Mania
 
 Spelunker at MobyGames
 Spelunker map, Atari 8-bit version

1983 video games
Broderbund games
Arcade video games
Ariolasoft games
Atari 8-bit family games
Commodore 64 games
Irem games
MSX games
Nintendo Entertainment System games
Platform games
 
Video games developed in the United States
Virtual Console games
Virtual Console games for Wii U
Single-player video games